Tariff of 1791 or Excise Whiskey Tax of 1791 was a United States statute establishing a taxation policy to further reduce Colonial America public debt as assumed by the residuals of American Revolution. The Act of Congress imposed duties or tariffs on domestic and imported distilled spirits generating government revenue while fortifying the Federalist Era.

The H.R. 110 tariff legislation originated as a panacea for the Hamiltonian economic program. The Debt Assumption policy was introduced as a series of public credit and national debt reports authored by Alexander Hamilton from 1790 to 1795.

Opposition of Federalist Economic Plan
Colonial America was observant of the militia insurrection in response to the progressive debt collection and tax rulings charged by the Federalist taxation plan.

Shays' Rebellion and Whiskey Rebellion were notable uprisings where American colonists, often referred as the anti-federalists, express their sentiments concerning the public debt reconciliation plan while the newly formed government fulfilled the demands of Funding Act of 1790 during the late 18th century. The colonial protests were necessitated by the enforcement of the Federalist taxation plan as submitted by Alexander Hamilton on January 14, 1790 better known as the First Report on the Public Credit.

Associated Distilled Spirits Statutes
Chronology of 18th century colonial laws related to the duties or tariffs applied to domestic and imported distilled spirits.

See also

Colonial and European Ambassadors, Diplomats, Financiers, Merchants, and Statesmen

References

18th Century Documents Related to Colonial Debt

Correspondence of Alexander Hamilton & George Washington

Bibliography

Historical Video Archives

External links
 
 
 
 
 
 
 
 
 

1791 in American law
1791 in the United States
Acts of the 1st United States Congress
United States federal taxation legislation
1791